Bowerbank may refer to:
 Bowerbank, Maine
 James Scott Bowerbank (1797-1877), British naturalist and palaeontologist